The Australian Volleyball League (AVL) for women is the largest national volleyball competition organized by the Australian Volleyball Federation (AVF) in women's Level and was established in 1998.

History
In the 2019/20 AVL season, 8 teams has participated in the regular season of which 4 has qualified to the final four round : QLD Pirates, Canberra Heat, Melbourne Vipers and Adelaide Storm. 
The Championship title was won by Melbourne Vipers beating out QLD Pirates in a Single Decisive match with 3 – 2 score.

Winners list

References

External links
  Australian League. women.volleybox.net
 Australian Volleyball Federation

 

Australian Women's Volleyball League
Volleyball competitions in Australia
Australian Women's Volleyball League
Professional sports leagues in Australia